The front fork is a suspension component for either:
 Bicycle fork
 Motorcycle fork